5 Cancri is a single star in the zodiac constellation of Cancer, located around 520 light years away from the Sun.  It is just visible to the naked eye under good seeing conditions as a dim, blue-white hued star with an apparent visual magnitude of 5.99. This object is moving closer to the Sun with a heliocentric radial velocity of −10 km/s.

At one point this was thought to be a spectroscopic binary system. It is a Be star with a weak circumstellar disk of gas that has around three times the radius of the host star. The stellar classification of 5 Cancri is B9.5 Vn, matching a B-type main-sequence star with "nebulous" lines due to rapid rotation. It is 36 million years old with a high projected rotational velocity of 188 km/s. The star has 2.9 times the mass of the Sun and about 3.1 times the Sun's radius. It is radiating 121 times the Sun's luminosity from its photosphere at an effective temperature of 9,727 K.

See also
 Cancer (Chinese astronomy)
 List of stars in Cancer

References

B-type main-sequence stars
Be stars
High-proper-motion stars
Cancer (constellation)
Durchmusterung objects
Cancri, 05
065873
039236
3134